This article describes the history of Australian cricket from the 1930–31 season until 1945.

Notable Australian players during this period include Don Bradman, Bert Oldfield, Bill O'Reilly, Bill Woodfull, Bill Ponsford and Stan McCabe.

Domestic cricket

Sheffield Shield winners
 1930–31 – Victoria
 1931–32 – New South Wales
 1932–33 – New South Wales
 1933–34 – Victoria
 1934–35 – Victoria
 1935–36 – South Australia
 1936–37 – Victoria
 1937–38 – New South Wales
 1938–39 – South Australia
 1939–40 – New South Wales
 1941–45 – no competition due to Second World War

International tours of Australia

West Indies 1930–31
For information about this tour, see: West Indian cricket team in Australia in 1930-31

South Africa 1931–32
For information about this tour, see: South African cricket team in Australia in 1931-32

England 1932–33
For information about this tour, see: English cricket team in Australia in 1932-33

MCC 1935–36
For information about this tour, see: Marylebone Cricket Club cricket team in Australia in 1935–36

England 1936–37 
For information about this tour, see: English cricket team in Australia in 1936-37

New Zealand 1937–38
For information about this tour, see: New Zealand cricket team in Australia and Ceylon in 1937–38

References

External sources
 CricketArchive — itinerary of Australian cricket

Further reading
 Bill Frindall, The Wisden Book of Test Cricket 1877–1978, Wisden, 1979
 Chris Harte, A History of Australian Cricket, Andre Deutsch, 1993
 Ray Robinson, On Top Down Under, Cassell, 1975